Stoneleigh is a suburban area southwest of London, situated in the north of the Epsom and Ewell borough in the county of Surrey, England. In the 2011 Census, the population was 8741.

The area was formerly part of the Great Park and Little Park of Nonsuch in the Tudor era. Nonsuch Park today is situated on the site of the Little Park in the east of the suburb, extending into East Ewell and Cheam.

The construction of the railway station, in 1932, was responsible for initiating the development of much of Stoneleigh, which was largely completed by the onset of World War 2 in late 1939.

History

Early history

The Roman road Stane Street passed through the eastern area of what is now Stoneleigh (along the modern day London Road/A24) on its way from London to Chichester via the nearby spring at Ewell.  Between the early 16th and early 18th century, the area which is now Stoneleigh was part of the Great Park of Nonsuch Palace. In 1731 the Nonsuch estate was sold off and the Great Park, by then known as Worcester Park was divided up and turned into farmland.

Bowling Green and Coldharbour farms in the north of the park were run jointly and in 1860 were acquired by John Jeffries Stone. He had a large house he called 'Stoneleigh', close to the Bowling Green Farmhouse, which gave its name to the district (a map published in 1871 names a cluster of buildings located between the modern-day Elmwood Drive and Ewell Park Way as "Bowling Green Farm", yet a map published in 1897 names a cluster of buildings on the same plot as "Stoneleigh").

In 1859 the London and South Western Railway opened the Wimbledon and Epsom Line, passing through Stoneleigh, although no commuter station was opened for a further 60 years.  Farming was at its peak at the start of the 20th century when there were nearly twenty farms, but the number reduced rapidly after the First World War, as there was great demand for housing it became profitable to sell off the farmland for development.

Maps from 1911 show the many areas of farmland in what is now the Stoneleigh area. There was also a brick, tile, and pottery works, called the Nonsuch Works and two flour mills. In 1915 only London Road (A24) contained homes, which could be found along the length of Nonsuch Park, although most were close to the large 'Stoneleigh' house.

Later history

Between the world wars, demand for housing on commuter routes into London meant the area grew rapidly. Maps from 1931 show the land was mainly "Meadowland and permanent grass" with patches of "Forest and woodland" and "Heathland, moorland, commons and rough pasture".

Stoneleigh railway station was opened in July 1932, on land acquired from the Stoneleigh Park Estate in July 1931. Stoneleigh railway station was originally to be named 'Stoneleigh Park' to denote that it was an area of market gardening, but this did not happen, probably due to the next three stations on the line north all being called 'Park' (Worcester Park, Motspur Park and Raynes Park).

The first houses were built in 1933 and the first shops on Stoneleigh Broadway opened in November of the same year. The Stoneleigh Hotel, now a Grade II listed building, opened in November 1935 and additional shops were built on the Broadway in the late 1930s.

In 1938, Stoneleigh Methodist church was completed, the same year that the Rembrandt cinema opened next to the railway line on the Kingston Road. The cinema operated for 60 years until its closure in April 1998. The building was subsequently demolished and replaced by flats. The red-brick Anglican church of St John the Baptist, next to the station, was built in 1939. Two large schools (Stoneleigh East and West) were built in Stoneleigh in the 1930s to accommodate the large suburban growth in the area. These schools still exist under different names.

The vast majority of the Stoneleigh area had been built on before construction was halted by the onset of World War 2 in late 1939, with almost all the new homes being semi-detached. A small section in the northwest of Stoneleigh Broadway was built in the 1960s. Additionally, an area in the far north of Stoneleigh was developed into housing around this time following the closure of the Worcester Park Brick Works.

Geography
The suburb has no high rise buildings. It contains or borders two mostly dual carriageway primary A roads; the A240 Kingston Road and Ewell Bypass in both the Auriol and Stoneleigh wards, and the A24 in the Stoneleigh ward, from the Organ Crossroads to the traffic lights with Sparrow Farm Road, via Nonsuch Park, near where Stane Street used to be.

Stoneleigh is associated with an area extending as far as the Kingston Road (A240) in the west, The Organ Crossroads to the south, Nonsuch Park in the southeast, Sparrow Farm Road to the northeast and Timbercroft and Auriol Park to the northwest. Auriol Park, for example, is in the Auriol Ward but is in the KT4, Worcester Park, postcode area. The area of the Ewell Court Ward east of Kingston road in the KT19 postcode is considered to be in Stoneleigh.

Topography
The Ewell Court Stream of the Hogsmill River runs through Stoneleigh, rising in Nonsuch Park. It runs underground throughout Briarwood Road and Stoneleigh Park Road before re-emerging at the nearby Ewell Court Lake. The Beverley Brook's source is at the extreme north of the suburb at Sparrow Farm Road before it flows into Worcester Park through Cuddington Recreation Ground. 

Ordance Survey maps suggest that the suburb is located between 25 and 52 metres above sea level, peaking at 52 metres in Stoneleigh Crescent just north-west of Stoneleigh Station and dropping to 25 metres in the extreme west at Timbercroft/Salisbury Road. The high point is a summit between the Ewell Court Stream, the Beverley Brook and the Hogsmill River, with the low near to the Hogsmill. The cente of the suburb (Stoneleigh Broadway) is at about 37 metres on a gentle incline just north of the Ewell Court Stream.

Surrounding area

Demography and housing
At the time of the 2001 Census Stoneleigh Ward had a population of 4,700, an increase of 3.6% from 1991, with 2,378 females and 2,322 males. Auriol Ward is the smallest in the Borough with a population of 3,687 in the 2001 Census, a decrease of 19% from 1991, with 1,858 females and 1,829 males. This decrease in population is because of the area lost to the Ewell Court ward, where the population increased by 19%. In 2022, this area is set to be regained from Ewell Court back to Auriol, simultaneously to the creation of the new Horton Ward in the west of the borough.

Parks and Open Spaces
The western part of Nonsuch Park is located in the east of Stoneleigh, including the wooded area around the Stoneleigh Swamp. The rest of the park is in East Ewell and Cheam. The Cheam section contains the Mansion and gardens.

Auriol Park is in the north west of Stoneleigh, near Worcester Park. It contains a playground, tennis and basketball courts in addition to football pitches.

There is also a small area of green space in the south, on Park Avenue West/Ewell By-Pass. It is known locally as the Alex Gurteen Recreation Ground.

Economy

The largest shops are a Co-Op on the south side of the Broadway and a Sainsbury's on the north side. Also on the north side of The Broadway is Stoneleigh Library, which opened in 1966. It has been run by volunteers since 2013. Stoneleigh also has smaller parades and shopping areas including:
Stoneleigh Parade and Kingston Parade, both at the junction of Stoneleigh Park Road and the A240 Kingston Road. This is on the border with Ewell Court. Other shops including a post office can be found opposite the two parades on the Ewell side. 
Cunliffe Parade on Vale Road, which has a post office and a convenience store. This is located on the border with Worcester Park. The Willow Tree pub is situated opposite Cunliffe Parade. 
West Parade on A240 Kingston Road which has a supermarket. Near the border with West Ewell and Worcester Park

The Organ Inn 
The Organ Inn was a landmark pub located on the southern boundary junction of Stoneleigh where the A24, A240 and B2200 roads intersect. It opened in the 1780s as the drinking place of the workmen who fitted the Father Willis organ in St Mary's Church in Ewell. It was later converted into a bar/restaurant, firstly under the name Jim Thompsons and finally The Organ and Dragon.

The pub closed on 18 July 2012 after around 230 years of business. The building was demolished in June 2014 after supermarket chain Lidl bought the site. The demolishing of the Organ and Dragon was criticized by local MP Chris Grayling. Kentucky Fried Chicken had previously owned the site and had unsuccessfully applied for planning permission to turn it into one of their restaurants .

Transport
Stoneleigh railway station is served by South Western Railway trains running between London Waterloo and Guildford or Dorking, via Wimbledon and Epsom.

Three bus routes go either through or along the edge of Stoneleigh. The E16 (Stoneleigh Circular) stops at both Station Approach and Stoneleigh Broadway along its circular route, which also runs through Epsom, Ewell and Worcester Park. The 406 bus (between Kingston and Epsom) runs along the A240 past Park Avenue West, Stoneleigh Park Road and Thorndon Gardens and the 293 bus (between Morden and Epsom) runs along the A24 (London Road) alongside Nonsuch Park.

Education

There are four schools in Stoneleigh: the Mead Infant School and Auriol Junior School are in the Auriol Ward, with Nonsuch Primary School and Meadow Primary School in the Stoneleigh Ward. No secondary schools exist in Stoneleigh, with most students travelling to schools in Epsom, Ewell, Tolworth and Cheam.

The Mead Infant School on Newbury Gardens is for children from nursery year to school year 2 (ages 3–7). It is adjacent to Auriol Junior School on Vale Road which caters for children in school years 3 to 6 (ages 7–11).

The two schools in the Stoneleigh Ward are both Primary Schools, catering for children up to school year 6 (3–11 years old). Meadow Primary School on Sparrow Farm Road was formed by the merger of Stoneleigh First School and Sparrow Farm Junior School. Nonsuch Primary School on Chadacre Road is run by Sutton Council despite being situated in Epsom and Ewell.

Notable people
Playwright John Osborne lived at 68 Stoneleigh Park Road. His grandparents lived at the end of Clandon Close. He recounted his experiences as an adolescent living in 1930s and 1940s Stoneleigh and Ewell in his 1981 autobiography, A Better Class of Person.

In the 1950s and 1960s, variety performer Bob Pearson lived in the area with his wife Vera.

Writer Jane Wilson-Howarth lived in Stoneleigh and was educated at Stoneleigh East County Infants, Junior and Secondary Schools.

See also
List of places of worship in Epsom and Ewell

Notes

External links
Stoneleigh and Auriol Residents' Association

References

Epsom and Ewell